is a Japanese football player, who plays for Iwate Grulla Morioka as a defender.

Career
After four years at Kanto Gakuin University, he joined Nagano Parceiro in January 2011.

Club statistics
Updated to 23 February 2020.

Includes J2/J3 playoffs.

References

External links
Profile at Nagano Parceiro

1989 births
Living people
Kanto Gakuin University alumni
Association football people from Nagasaki Prefecture
Japanese footballers
J3 League players
Japan Football League players
AC Nagano Parceiro players
Iwate Grulla Morioka players
Association football defenders